Ulli Wolf (born 28 February 1949) is an Austrian rower. He competed at the 1972 Summer Olympics and the 1976 Summer Olympics.

References

1949 births
Living people
Austrian male rowers
Olympic rowers of Austria
Rowers at the 1972 Summer Olympics
Rowers at the 1976 Summer Olympics
Sportspeople from Villach